John Ray FRS (29 November 1627 – 17 January 1705) was a Christian English naturalist widely regarded as one of the earliest of the English parson-naturalists. Until 1670, he wrote his name as John Wray. From then on, he used 'Ray', after "having ascertained that such had been the practice of his family before him". He published important works on botany, zoology, and natural theology. His classification of plants in his Historia Plantarum, was an important step towards modern taxonomy. Ray rejected the system of dichotomous division by which species were classified according to a pre-conceived, either/or type system , and instead classified plants according to similarities and differences that emerged from observation. He was among the first to attempt a biological definition for the concept of species, as "a group of morphologically similar organisms arising from a common ancestor". Another significant contribution to taxonomy was his division of plants into those with two seedling leaves (dicotyledons) or only one (monocotyledons), a division used in taxonomy today.

Life

Early life 

John Ray was born in the village of Black Notley in Essex. He is said to have been born in the smithy, his father having been the village blacksmith. After studying at Braintree school, he was sent at the age of sixteen to Cambridge University: studying at Trinity College. Initially at Catharine Hall, his tutor was Daniel Duckfield, and later transferred to Trinity where his tutor was James Duport, and his intimate friend and fellow-pupil the celebrated Isaac Barrow. Ray was chosen minor fellow of Trinity in 1649, and later major fellow. He held many college offices, becoming successively lecturer in Greek (1651), mathematics (1653), and humanity (1655), praelector (1657), frias (1657), and college steward (1659 and 1660); and according to the habit of the time, he was accustomed to preach in his college chapel and also at Great St Mary's, long before he took holy orders on 23 December 1660. Among these sermons were his discourses on The wisdom of God manifested in the works of the creation, and Deluge and Dissolution of the World. Ray was also highly regarded as a tutor and he communicated his own passion for natural history to several pupils. Ray's student, Isaac Barrow, helped Francis Willughby learn mathematics and Ray collaborated with Willughby later. It was at Trinity that he came under the influence of John Wilkins, when the latter was appointed master of the college in 1659.

Later life and family 

After leaving Cambridge in 1663 he spent some time travelling both in Britain and the continent. In 1673, Ray married Margaret Oakley of Launton in Oxfordshire; in 1676 he went to Middleton Hall near Tamworth, and in 1677 to Falborne (or Faulkbourne) Hall in Essex. Finally, in 1679, he removed to his birthplace at Black Notley, where he afterwards remained. His life there was quiet and uneventful, although he had poor health, including chronic sores. Ray kept writing books and corresponded widely on scientific matters, collaborating with his doctor and contemporary Samuel Dale. He lived, in spite of his infirmities, to the age of seventy-seven, dying at Black Notley. He is buried in the churchyard of St Peter and St Paul where there is a memorial to him. He is widely regarded as one of the earliest of the English parson-naturalists.

Work 

At Cambridge, Ray spent much of his time in the study of natural history, a subject which would occupy him for most of his life, from 1660 to the beginning of the eighteenth century. When Ray found himself unable to subscribe as required by the ‘Bartholomew Act’ of 1662 he, along with 13 other college fellows, resigned his fellowship on 24 August 1662 rather than swear to the declaration that the Solemn League and Covenant was not binding on those who had taken it. Tobias Smollett quoted the reasoning given in the biography of Ray by William Derham:
"The reason of his refusal was not (says his biographer) as some have imagined, his having taken the solemn league and covenant; for that he never did, and often declared that he ever thought it an unlawful oath: but he said he could not say, for those that had taken the oath, that no obligation lay upon them, but feared there might."
His religious views were generally in accord with those imposed under the restoration of Charles II of England, and (though technically a nonconformist) he continued as a layman in the Established Church of England.

From this time onwards he seems to have depended chiefly on the bounty of his pupil Francis Willughby, who made Ray his constant companion while he lived. They travelled extensively, carrying out field observations and collecting specimens of botany, ornithology, ichthyology, mammals, reptiles and insects. Initially they agreed that Ray would take responsibility for the plants, and Willughby for birds, beasts, fishes, and insects. Willughby arranged that after his death, Ray would have 6 shillings a year for educating Willughby's two sons.

In the spring of 1663 Ray started together with Willughby and two other pupils (Philip Skippon and Nathaniel Bacon) on a tour through Europe, from which he returned in March 1666, parting from Willughby at Montpellier, whence the latter continued his journey into Spain. He had previously in three different journeys (1658, 1661, 1662) travelled through the greater part of Great Britain, and selections from his private notes of these journeys were edited by George Scott in 1760, under the title of Mr Ray's Itineraries. Ray himself published an account of his foreign travel in 1673, entitled Observations topographical, moral, and physiological, made on a Journey through part of the Low Countries, Germany, Italy, and France. From this tour Ray and Willughby returned laden with collections, on which they meant to base complete systematic descriptions of the animal and vegetable kingdoms.

In 1667 Ray was elected Fellow of the Royal Society, and in 1669 he and Willughby published a paper on Experiments concerning the Motion of Sap in Trees. In 1671, he presented the research of Francis Jessop on formic acid to the Royal Society.

Following Willughby's death in 1672, Ray took on the responsibility of bringing both Willughby's work and his own to publication.  Ray was left with an ornithology and ichthyology to edit as well as his own work dealing with mammals, reptiles and insects. Although he presented the
Ornithologia (1676) as Wullughby's, he made extensive contributions to the work. His task became more difficult after the death of Lady Cassandra, Willughby's mother, on July 25, 1675. Lady Cassandra had supported Ray's continued work, but the widow Willughby had no interest in her late husband's scientific interests or his scientific friends. Ray was no longer allowed to instruct the children, and Ray and his wife Margaret Oakley were forced to leave the Willughby household in Middleton. Critically, Ray lost access to the Willughby collections, notes and manuscripts at this time. The plants gathered on his British tours had already been described in his Catalogus plantarum Angliae (1670), which formed the basis for later English floras. He had likely already used the botanical collections to lay much of the groundwork of his Methodus plantarum nova (1682),  His great Historia generalis plantarum appeared in 3 vols. in 1686, 1688, 1704.

In the 1690s, he published three volumes on religion—the most popular being The Wisdom of God Manifested in the Works of the Creation (1691), an essay describing evidence that all in nature and space is God's creation as in the Bible is affirmed. In this volume, he moved on from the naming and cataloguing of species like his successor Carl Linnaeus. Instead, Ray considered species' lives and how nature worked as a whole, giving facts that are arguments for God's will expressed in His creation of all 'visible and invisible' (Colossians 1:16).
Ray gave an early description of dendrochronology, explaining for the ash tree how to find its age from its tree-rings.

Taxonomy 

Ray's work on plant taxonomy spanned a wide range of thought, starting with an approach that was predominantly in the tradition of the herbalists and Aristotelian, but becoming increasingly theoretical and finally rejecting Aristotelianism. Despite his early adherence to Aristotelian tradition, his first botanical work, the Catalogus plantarum circa Cantabrigiam nascentium (1660), was almost entirely descriptive, being arranged alphabetically. His model was an account by Bauhin of the plants growing around Basel in 1622 and was the first English county flora, covering about 630 species. However at the end of the work he appended a brief taxonomy which he stated followed the usage of Bauhin and other herbalists.

System of classification 

Ray's system, starting with his Cambridge catalogue, began with the division between the imperfect or lower plants (Cryptogams), and perfect (planta perfecta) higher plants (Seed plants). The latter he divided by life forms, e.g. trees (arbores), shrubs (frutices), subshrubs (suffrutices) and herbaceous plants (herbae) and lastly grouping them by common characteristics. The trees he divided into 8 groups, e.g. Pomiferae (including apple and pear). The shrubs he placed in 2 groups, Spinosi (Berberis etc.) and Non Spinosi (Jasmine etc.). The subshrubs formed a single group and the herbs into 21 groups.

Division of Herbae;

 Bulbosae (Lilium etc.)
 Tuberosae (Asphodelus etc.)
 Umbelliferae (Foeniculum etc.)
 Verticellatae (Mentha etc.)
 Spicatae (Lysimachia etc.)
 Scandentes (Cucurbita etc.)
 Corymbiferae (Tanacetum)
 Pappiflorae (Senecio etc.)
 Capitatae (Scabiosa etc.)
 Campaniformes (Digitalis etc.)
 Coronariae (Caryophyllus etc.)
 Rotundifoliae (Cyclamen etc.)
 Nervifoliae (Plantago etc.)
 Stellatae (Rubia etc.)
 Cerealia (Legumina etc.)
 Succulentae (Sedum etc.)
 Graminifoliae (Gramina etc.)
 [omitted]
 Oleraceae (Beta etc.)
 Aquaticae (Nymphaea etc.)
 Marinae (Fucus etc.)
 Saxatiles (Asplenium etc)

As outlined in his Historia Plantarum (1685–1703):
 Herbae (Herbaceous plants)
 Imperfectae (Cryptogams)
 Perfectae (Seed plants)
 Monocotyledons
 Dicotyledons
 Arborae (Trees)
 Monocotyledons
 Dicotyledons

Definition of species 

Ray was the first person to produce a biological definition of species, in his 1686 History of Plants:

"... no surer criterion for determining species has occurred to me than the distinguishing features that perpetuate themselves in propagation from seed. Thus, no matter what variations occur in the individuals or the species, if they spring from the seed of one and the same plant, they are accidental variations and not such as to distinguish a species... Animals likewise that differ specifically preserve their distinct species permanently; one species never springs from the seed of another nor vice versa".

Publications 

Ray published about 23 works, depending on how they are counted. The biological works were usually in Latin, the rest in English. His first publication, while at Cambridge, was the Catalogus plantarum circa Cantabrigiam nascentium (1660), followed by many works, botanical, zoological,theological and literary. Until 1670, he wrote his name as John Wray. From then on, he used 'Ray', after "having ascertained that such had been the practice of his family before him".

List of selected publications 

  Appendices 1663, 1685
 
 
 1668: Tables of plants, in John Wilkins' Essay
 
 1670: Collection of English proverbs.
 1673: Observations in the Low Countries and Catalogue of plants not native to England.
 1674: Collection of English words not generally used.online
 1675: Trilingual dictionary, or nomenclator classicus.
 1676:  Willughby's Ornithologia.
 
 English translation by Stephen Nimis
 1686: History of fishes.
 1686–1704: Historia plantarum species [History of plants]. London:Clark 3 vols;
 Vol 1 1686, Vol 2 1688, Vol 3 1704 (in Latin)
 Lazenby, Elizabeth Mary (1995).  The Historia Plantarum Generalis of John Ray, Book I : a translation and commentary. PhD thesis  Newcastle University
 
 2nd ed 1696
 1691: The wisdom of God Manifested in the Works of the Creation 7th ed. 2nd ed 1692, 3rd ed 1701, 4th ed 1704, 7th ed 1717
 1692: Miscellaneous discourses concerning the dissolution and changes of the world
 1693: Synopsis of animals and reptiles.
 1693: Collection of travels.
 1694: Collection of European plants.
 1695: Plants of each county. (Camden's Britannia)
 
 English translation by Stephen Nimis
 1700: A persuasive to a holy life.
 

Posthumous
 1705. Method and history of insects
 1713:  [http://gdz.sub.uni-goettingen.de/dms/load/toc/?PID=PPN383878012 Synopsis methodica avium & piscium: opus posthumum (Synopsis of birds and fishes), in Latin. William Innys, London] vol. 1: Avium vol. 2: Piscium
 1713 Three Physico-theological discourses
 
 Facsimile edition 197, Ray Society, London. With introduction by William T. Stearn. 
 Fourth edition 1760

Libraries holding Ray's works 
Including the various editions, there are 172 works of Ray, of which most are rare. The only libraries with substantial holdings are all in England.p153 The list in order of holdings is:

The British Library, Euston, London. Holds over 80 of the editions.
The Bodleian Library, University of Oxford.
The University of Cambridge Library.
Library of Trinity College, Cambridge.
The Natural History Museum Library, South Kensington, London.
The John Rylands Library, University of Manchester, Deansgate, Manchester
The Sobrang Bayabas, University of Bayabas

Legacy

Ray's biographer, Charles Raven, commented that "Ray sweeps away the litter of mythology and fable... and always insists upon accuracy of observation and description and the testing of every new discovery".p10 Ray's works were directly influential on the development of taxonomy by Carl Linnaeus.

The Ray Society, named after John Ray, was founded in 1844. It is a scientific text publication society and registered charity, based at the Natural History Museum, London, which exists to publish books on natural history, with particular (but not exclusive) reference to the flora and fauna of the British Isles. As of 2017, the Society had published 179 volumes.

The John Ray Society (a separate organisation) is the Natural Sciences Society at St Catharine's College, Cambridge. It organises a programme of events of interest to science students in the college.

In 1986, to mark the 300th anniversary of the publication of Ray's Historia Plantarum, there was a celebration of Ray's legacy in Braintree, Essex. A "John Ray Gallery" was opened in the Braintree Museum.

The John Ray Initiative (JRI) is an educational charity that seeks to reconcile scientific and Christian understandings of the environment. It was formed in 1997 in response to the global environmental crisis and the challenges of sustainable development and environmental stewardship. John Ray's writings proclaimed God as creator whose wisdom is "manifest in the works of creation", and as redeemer of all things. JRI aims to teach appreciation of nature, increase awareness of the state of the global environment, and to promote a Christian understanding of environmental issues.

See also 
 Monocotyledons

Notes

References

Bibliography

Books 
 
 
 
  (also here at Biodiversity Heritage Library)
 
  See also ebook 2010
 
 
 , see also 
 
 
 , in

Articles

Websites 
 , see also Ray Society
 John Ray's works at the Biodiversity Heritage Library

External links
 John Ray Biography (University of California Museum of Paleontology Berkeley)
 The first biological species concept (Evolving Thoughts)
 Memoir of John Ray by James Duncan
 Oxford Dictionary of National Biography
 De Variis Plantarum Methodis Dissertatio Brevis at Europeana
 John Ray and taxonomy. King's College London
 Encyclopaedia Britannica
 Dictionary of Scientific Biography

John Ray Initiative 
 The John Ray Initiative: connecting Environment and Christianity
 John Ray, by Professor Sam Berry
 John Ray on plants

1628 births
1705 deaths
Phycologists
Alumni of St Catharine's College, Cambridge
Alumni of Trinity College, Cambridge
Botanists with author abbreviations
English naturalists
Bryologists
17th-century English botanists
Fellows of the Royal Society
Paleobotanists
People from Black Notley
Parson-naturalists
17th-century Protestants
17th-century English writers
17th-century English male writers
18th-century English writers
18th-century English male writers
Burials in Essex
Writers about religion and science